William F. Calhoun (born November 21, 1844) was a dentist, state legislator, newspaper editor, and postmaster in Illinois. He served as Speaker of the House (List of speakers of the Illinois House of Representatives). He was born in Pennsylvania. He served in the Union Army during the American Civil War and was a Republican.

His wife was active in the Women's Relief Corps.

References

Members of the Illinois House of Representatives
Union Army soldiers
1844 births
Year of death missing
American dentists
American newspaper editors